Han Jae-Woong (born 29 September 1984) is a retired South Korean football player. He  played for Busan I'Park, Daejeon Citizen, Chunnam Dragons, Incheon United, Ulsan Hyundai, Daegu FC, Thai club Buriram United, Hong Kong clubs Rangers (HKG) and Eastern.

Han played at the 2003 FIFA World Youth Championship.

Club career statistics

References

External links
 

1984 births
Living people
Association football defenders
South Korean footballers
South Korean expatriate footballers
Busan IPark players
Daejeon Hana Citizen FC players
Jeonnam Dragons players
Incheon United FC players
Han Jae-woong
Ulsan Hyundai FC players
Daegu FC players
K League 1 players
Han Jae-woong
Expatriate footballers in Thailand
South Korean expatriate sportspeople in Thailand
Sportspeople from Incheon
Hong Kong Rangers FC players
Eastern Sports Club footballers